Bradford Libraries is a public library service serving the City of Bradford Metropolitan district in West Yorkshire, England.  There are 30 libraries including  City Library in Bradford city centre. There is also a Local Studies and Archives Library in separate premises in the city centre.

Bradford Central Library used to be in a multi-storey building opposite the Alhambra, just off the city centre. This building was found to be a fire risk in 2011 and additionally in 2013 was found to have asbestos inside its walls. A new city centre library was opened in December 2013 opposite City Hall and the local studies and reference library was moved into an annexe of the former library building to the south.

Keighley library was founded in 1902 and was the first Carnegie Library in England being paid for by Scots born industrialist Andrew Carnegie.

Bingley Library move from its former premises in Bingley Precinct in 2009, to a new smaller facility slightly east in the same precinct which was rebuilt and rebranded as the 5Rise Centre.

Shipley had a Carnegie library which was replaced with a building on a different site in 1985.  The new library underwent a £640,000 overhaul in 2015 and re-opened in early 2016.
 
In early 2016, budget restraints at Bradford Council led to the announcements that only the main libraries in the city centre, Bingley, Eccleshill, Ilkley, Keighley, Manningham and Shipley would carry on to be staffed and fully funded by the council. The council appealed to the local community to help with manning the other threatened libraries.

List of libraries

 Addingham
 Allerton
 Baildon
 Bingley
 Bolling Hall
 Burley
 City (Bradford)
 Clayton
 Denholme
 Eccleshill
 Girlington
 Great Horton
 Holme Wood
 Idle
 Ilkley
 Keighley
 Laisterdyke
 Manningham
 Menston
 Queensbury
 Shipley
 Silsden
 St Augustines
 Thornbury
 Thornton
 Wibsey
 Wilsden
 Wrose
 Wyke

See also 
 Bradford Mechanics' Institute Library

References

External links
 Bradford Libraries
 Bradford Libraries catalogue
 DIVA

Education in the City of Bradford
Public libraries in West Yorkshire